Haeger is a surname. Notable people with the surname include:

Annie Haeger (born 1990), American Olympic sailing contestant
Charlie Haeger (1983–2020), American baseball player
Lauren Haeger (born 1992), American softball player

See also
Haeger Potteries
Hager
Hagger